AV1 may refer to:
 AOMedia Video 1, a video format created by the Alliance for Open Media
 AV1 (robot), a telepresence robot.
 AV input number one, a television connector commonly labeled "AV1" or "AV-1".
 Canon AV-1, a camera introduced by Canon in 1979, so named because of its user selectable aperture value.
 Asparagus virus 1, a plant disease.